State Highway 336 (SH 336)  is a  state highway in the U.S. state of Texas.  The highway begins at a junction with Spur 241 in Hidalgo and heads north to a junction with State Highway 107 (SH 107) in Edinburg.

History
SH 336 was designated on November 22, 1940 to serve as a route between Hidalgo and Edinburg.

Route description
SH 336 begins at a junction with Spur 241 in Hidalgo.  It heads north from this junction to an intersection with FM 1016 in McAllen.  The highway continues to the north to an intersection with I-2/US 83.  The highway continues north through McAllen to an intersection with SH 495.  SH 336 reaches its northern terminus at SH 107 in Edinburg.

Junction list

References

336
Edinburg, Texas
Transportation in McAllen, Texas
Transportation in Hidalgo County, Texas